Kate Bruce (February 17, 1860 – April 2, 1946) was an American actress of the silent era. She appeared in more than 280 films between 1908 and 1931. She was born in Columbus, Indiana and died in New York City. In 1885, Bruce left Boone, Iowa in a wagon with a group of traveling actors at a time when stages were illuminated by oil lights. On Broadway, Bruce performed in The Starbucks (1903).

Partial filmography

 The Greaser's Gauntlet (1908)
 Betrayed by a Handprint (1908)
 Behind the Scenes (1908)
 An Awful Moment (1908)
 One Touch of Nature (1909)
 The Golden Louis (1909)
 At the Altar (1909)
 The Girls and Daddy (1909)
 The Country Doctor (1909)
 The Hessian Renegades (1909)
 The Red Man's View (1909)
 A Trap for Santa (1909)
 In Little Italy (1909)
 To Save Her Soul (1909)
 Choosing a Husband (1909)
 The Rocky Road (1910)
 All on Account of the Milk (1910)
 The Woman from Mellon's (1910)
 The Two Brothers (1910)
 A Romance of the Western Hills (1910)
 Ramona (1910)
 The Unchanging Sea (1910)
 What the Daisy Said (1910)
 The Lucky Toothache (1910)
 The Fugitive (1910)
 The Modern Prodigal (1910)
 His Trust (1911)
 His Trust Fulfilled (1911)
 The Spanish Gypsy (1911)
 How She Triumphed (1911)
 Fighting Blood (1911)
 A Country Cupid (1911)
 The Long Road (1911)
 Swords and Hearts (1911)
 Her Awakening (1911)
 The Battle (1911)
 The Voice of the Child (1911)
 The Eternal Mother (1912)
 The Transformation of Mike (1912)
 A String of Pearls (1912)
 The Punishment (1912)
 Won by a Fish (1912)
 One Is Business, the Other Crime (1912)
 The Spirit Awakened (1912)
 A Feud in the Kentucky Hills (1912)
 The One She Loved (1912)
 The Painted Lady (1912)
 Heredity (1912)
 The Informer (1912)
 Just Like a Woman (1912)
 The New York Hat (1912)
 My Hero (1912)
 A Cry for Help (1912)
 The Telephone Girl and the Lady (1913)
 A Girl's Stratagem (1913)
 The Unwelcome Guest (1913)
 The Sheriff's Baby (1913)
 A Frightful Blunder (1913)
 A Misunderstood Boy (1913)
 The Wanderer (1913)
 The Stolen Loaf (1913)
 The House of Darkness (1913)
 Olaf—An Atom (1913)
 Just Gold (1913)
 The Mothering Heart (1913)
 The Enemy's Baby (1913)
 The Perfidy of Mary (1913)
 The Strong Man's Burden (1913)
 The Stopped Clock (1913)
 The Battle at Elderbush Gulch (1913)
 The Tender Hearted Boy (1913)
 The Little Tease (1913)
 The Yaqui Cur (1913)
 A Nest Unfeathered (1914)
 Judith of Bethulia (1914)
 The Rebellion of Kitty Belle (1914)
 His Desperate Deed (1915)
 Intolerance (1916)
 Gretchen the Greenhorn (1916)
 The House Built Upon Sand (1916)
 Souls Triumphant (1917)
 Madame Bo-Peep (1917)
 Betsy's Burglar (1917)
 A Woman's Awakening (1917)
 Time Locks and Diamonds (1917)
 The Stainless Barrier (1917)
 Lillian Gish in a Liberty Loan Appeal (1918)
 The Greatest Thing in Life (1918)
 A Romance of Happy Valley (1919)
 Scarlet Days (1919)
 True Heart Susie (1919)
 Way Down East (1920)
 Flying Pat (1920)
 The City of Silent Men (1921)
 His Darker Self (1924)
 A Bowery Cinderella (1927)
 Ragtime (1927)
 The Struggle (1931)

References

External links

1860 births
1946 deaths
American silent film actresses
American film actresses
People from Columbus, Indiana
20th-century American actresses
Actresses from Indiana
Burials at Calvary Cemetery (Queens)
American stage actresses